Cheatin is a 2013 American adult animated comedy-drama film by Bill Plympton.

Plot
Ella, a beautiful woman tired of unwanted attention from men, strolls through a carnival while reading a book. A barker talks her into trying the bumper cars, but the result is a perilous accident that leaves Ella trapped. A stranger, the handsome and muscular Jake, rescues her, and the two fall in love and are soon married. Various women attempt to seduce Jake, but he remains steadfastly faithful.

Enraged by this slight, one of these women stages a photo of Ella, changing in a room full of male mannequins, and gives it to Jake. Jake, distraught by what he believes to be his wife's infidelity, contemplates suicide, but soon takes solace in a series of affairs. When Ella discovers this infidelity, she tries to hire a man to kill Jake, before finding a magician who has a machine that will allow her to temporarily transport her consciousness into the bodies of the women Jake is sleeping with.

Cast
Sophia Takal as Ella, a beautiful woman who used to be lonely until she met the man of her life, Jake. She starts off as an innocent, sweet, and strong young woman, but once she finds her husband sleeping with other women, she becomes more vengeful and hatred. 
Jeremy Baumann as Jake, a handsome, buff man and Ella's husband. At first loving and devoted to her, but after assuming she had an affair with a bunch of other men, he decides to do the same.

Background
The Cheatin' animation consists of monochrome pencil-sketches, which are then digitally colored and composited to create a watercolor-like image. All animation was drawn by Plympton himself, but the colorization and compositing required a staff of about 10 people.

To finance this more expensive process, Plympton launched a crowdfunding campaign on Kickstarter on Dec 3, 2012 with a goal of $75,000. On February 1, 2013, the campaign completed with $100,916. On August 22, 2014, an online streaming version was delivered to backers. Physical copies of the film began shipping that December.

Accolades

References

External links

2013 films
Animated drama films
Films directed by Bill Plympton
Kickstarter-funded films
American animated feature films
2010s American animated films
Anifilm award winners
Films about infidelity